Kushi Nagar Lok Sabha constituency is one of the 80 Lok Sabha (parliamentary) constituencies in Uttar Pradesh state in India. This constituency came into existence in 2008 as a part of the implementation of delimitation of parliamentary constituencies based on the recommendations of the Delimitation Commission of India constituted in 2002.

Assembly Segments
Presently, Kushi Nagar Lok Sabha constituency comprises Five Vidhan Sabha (legislative assembly) segments. These are:

Ramkola, Hata and Padrauna assembly segments were earlier in erstwhile Padrauna Lok Sabha constituency.

Members of Parliament

Key

Election Results

See also
 Padrauna Lok Sabha constituency
 Kushinagar district
 List of Constituencies of the Lok Sabha

Notes

Lok Sabha constituencies in Uttar Pradesh
Kushinagar district